Moseyevo is a rural locality (a village) in Chushevitskoye Rural Settlement, Verkhovazhsky District, Vologda Oblast, Russia. The population was 10 as of 2002.

Geography 
Moseyevo is located 46 km southwest of Verkhovazhye (the district's administrative centre) by road. Podsosenye is the nearest rural locality.

References 

Rural localities in Verkhovazhsky District